There is considerable controversy regarding social status in the Ottoman Empire. Social scientists have developed class models on the socio-economic stratification of Ottoman society which feature more or less congruent theories. Albert Hourani described the Ottoman Empire as "a bureaucratic state, holding different regions within a single administrative and fiscal system".

The Ottoman Empire lasted for over six hundred years (1299–1923) and encompassed present-day Turkey, the Balkans and the Fertile Crescent. Thus the Empire included an extremely diverse population ranging from the Muslim majority (Turks, Arabs, Bosniaks, Albanians, etc) to various minority populations, specifically Christians and Jews, whom Muslims referred to as "People of the Book". As an imperial/colonial enterprise, the Ottoman system allowed some Greeks, Tatars, Italians, Albanians, Serbs, Hungarians, Georgians, Bulgarians, Ruthenians and Circassians, kul and azad, to attain high office as  soldiers,  viziers or  members of the imperial family.

References

Bibliography